Piešťany District (okres Piešťany) is a district in the Trnava Region of western Slovakia, with the town of Piešťany being as its seat, cultural and economic center.

Geography 
The district lies in the northern part of the Trnava Region. It is bordered by the Trnava District in the west and southwest, Hlohovec District in the south, Topoľčany District in the Nitra Region in the southeast and east, Nové Mesto nad Váhom District in the northeast and north and by the Myjava District in the northwest (both previous belong to the Trenčín Region). The main geographical features are the Little Carpathians in the west, Váh Inovec in the east, Danubian Hills in the center and south and the Váh and Dudváh rivers.

Piešťany District has an area of 381 km2 and a population of 64,019.

History 

The lands of the current Pieštany District have been inhabited since the Paleolithic era, but many archaeological findings are dated even earlier, for example the known Venus of Moravany is dated from the earlier Stone Ages (22,800 BC). Many hillforts were built in the Iron Ages. In the 1st century AD, it was centre of Germanic kingdom in the Váh region. The Slavs started to move into the area in the 5th and 6th centuries, who were ruling the area until the early 10th century, when the Magyar tribes started to move into the area, however, the area remained predominantly Slavic. The most known monument from this part is the Great Moravian hillfort near the village of Ducové, which existed from the second half of the 9th to the first half of the 10th century. Since the 13th century, the area was part of the Nitra comitatus, which evolved later into the Nitra county, which existed until 1918. The area suffered in the 15th and again in the 16th and particularly 17th centuries, first when the Hussites were warring, and not put out until 1473, with their last stand near Veľké Kostoľany captured by the forces of the Matthias Corvinus. The Ottomans encroaching from the south were threatening the area mainly since 1663, after fall of the Nové Zámky fortress, but were put out near the end of the 17th century. The Anti-Habsburg uprisings in the 17th and in the early 18th century were also causing trouble. The now well-known spas in Piešťany were discovered in the 16th century. Until 1918, the district was part of the Hungarian county of Nitra.

In 1918, it became part of the first Czechoslovak republic, first as part of the Bratislava county, and later as part of the so-called Slovak Land. During the wartime Slovak Republic, it was part of the extended Trenčín county. When Czechoslovak rule was restored in 1945, it was a district until 1960, at which time it became part of the Trnava district, belonging to the Western Slovak Region. After Slovakia's independence in 1993, the current district was formed in 1996.

Municipalities 
Piešťany District has 27 municipalities, of which 2 have a town statute. 56.5% of the district's population lives in towns.

Sources 
 http://www.statistics.sk/mosmis/eng/run.html
  (Slovak, with brief summary in German)

References 

 
Districts of Slovakia